Lough Beltra or Beltra Lough is a lake in County Mayo, Ireland.

It is located in a mountainous region, west of Croaghmoyle and northeast of Newport. The name in Irish is Loch Bhéal Trá, "lake of the beach mouth".

Wildlife

Lough Beltra is a noted fishery for salmon and sea trout.

See also 
 List of loughs in Ireland

References 

Lakes of County Mayo